West Middleton is an unincorporated community between Russiaville and Kokomo in western Howard County, Indiana, United States. It is part of the Kokomo, Indiana Metropolitan Statistical Area.

West Middleton's old school's nickname was the Broncos.

History
West Middleton was laid out in 1873 by William Middleton, and named for him.

Geography
West Middleton is located at  (40.439444, -86.216111) on County Road 250 South Road (Alto Road).

References

Unincorporated communities in Howard County, Indiana
Unincorporated communities in Indiana
Kokomo, Indiana metropolitan area